Kriengkrai Narom (born 9 November 1964) is a Thai sprinter. He competed in the men's 4 × 100 metres relay at the 1992 Summer Olympics.

References

1964 births
Living people
Athletes (track and field) at the 1992 Summer Olympics
Kriengkrai Narom
Kriengkrai Narom
Place of birth missing (living people)